Charles Tutt may refer to:

 Charles L. Tutt, Sr. (1864–1909), miner and prominent citizen in Colorado Springs
 Charles L. Tutt, Jr. (1889–1961), his son, American philanthropist
 Charles L. Tutt, III (1911–1993), his son, president of the American Society of Mechanical Engineers